Coronavirus Task Force may refer to:

White House Coronavirus Task Force
Inter-Agency Task Force for the Management of Emerging Infectious Diseases, a Philippine government task force which responded to the COVID-19 pandemic in the Philippines